"Lucky One" is a single by American Christian music singer Amy Grant. It was released as the first single from her 11th studio album, House of Love (1994), in August 1994. The song reached number five on the Billboard Adult Contemporary chart and number 18 on the Billboard Hot 100, giving Grant her last US top-20 hit. It also peaked at number four in Canada and reached the top 75 in Germany and the United Kingdom.

Track listings
US CD single
 "Lucky One" (remix)
 "Lucky One" (The Lucky Street mix)
 "Lucky One" (The A/C Rhythm mix)
 "Lucky One" (Kupper radio)
 "Good For Me" (7-inch Good for You mix)

UK CD1
 "Lucky One"
 "Baby Baby" (No Getting Over You mix)
 "Every Heartbeat" (7-inch Heart and Soul mix)

UK CD2
 "Lucky One"
 "Lucky One" (remix)
 "Lucky One" (The Lucky Street mix)
 "Lucky One" (Martyn Phillips mix)

Personnel
 Amy Grant – lead and backing vocals 
 Keith Thomas – acoustic piano, synthesizers, bass programming, drum programming 
 Scott Denté – acoustic guitar 
 Will Owsley – acoustic guitar 
 Jerry McPherson – electric guitars
 Tommy Sims – bass guitar
 Mark Hammond – drum programming 
 Athena Cage – backing vocals 
 Lisa Keith – backing vocals

Charts

Weekly charts

Year-end charts

References

A&M Records singles
Amy Grant songs
1994 singles
1994 songs
Song recordings produced by Keith Thomas (record producer)
Songs written by Amy Grant
Songs written by Keith Thomas (record producer)